Miranda Collins may refer to:

Miranda Collins, fictional character in Ravenswood (TV series) and Pretty Little Liars
Miranda Collins, fictional character in Flashpoint played by Michelle Giroux